Severiano Martínez Anido (21 May 1862 – 24 December 1938) was a Spanish general who served in a number of government posts in Spain during the Primo de Rivera and Francoist dictatorships.

References

1862 births
1938 deaths
Government ministers during the Francoist dictatorship
Deputy Prime Ministers of Spain
Interior ministers of Spain